Gauri Pradhan Tejwani is a former model turned Indian television actress. She is best known for playing the roles of Gauri Pratham Mittal in Kutumb, Nandini Karan Virani in Kyunki Saas Bhi Kabhi Bahu Thi, Falguni Harshad Parekh in Meri Aashiqui Tumse Hi and Anita Sharma in Tu Aashiqui.

Early life and education 
Pradhan was born in Jammu, Jammu and Kashmir, India in Marathi family. Her father Major Subhash Vasudeo Pradhan is a retired Indian Army Officer and her mother Asha is a homemaker. Pradhan is the second of three siblings; her elder brother Bharat, is a petrochemical engineer, while her younger sister Geetanjali, is a M.D. Pradhan is the only one in her family to have pursued modelling and acting as a career.

Her childhood was spent travelling throughout the country owing to the nature of her father's job. As a result, she studied in different schools, one of them was the Carmel Convent School in Udhampur. After her father's retirement, the family settled in Pune (Maharashtra), where she attended Sir Parshurambhau College for a course in BSc (Electronics). Later she enrolled for a course in psychology from an institute affiliated with London University.

Personal life 

Gauri met her future husband Hiten Tejwani in Hyderabad while shooting for a commercial for Breeze soap. Later on, they met on the sets of tele-series Kutumb and were coincidentally cast as the lead pair. The onscreen chemistry led to the brewing of romance between them and they started dating. While playing the characters of star crossed lovers Karan and Nandini in another daily soap Kyunki Saas Bhi Kabhi Bahu Thi, they decided to get married.

After two years of courtship, they got married as per Maharashtrian customs at a private ceremony in the Sun-n-Sand Hotel in Pune on 29 April 2004, with about 40–50 guests in attendance. Soon after they went to Ko Samui in Thailand for honeymoon. Their reception was held at Juhu's Army Club on 9 May 2004, with over 400 guests.

On 11 November 2009, they became parents when Pradhan gave birth to twins, a son and a daughter, at the Lilavati Hospital, Bandra, Mumbai.

Career 

Pradhan's modelling stint commenced at age 18, primarily in Pune. In 1998, while still in her second year of a BSc course she moved to Mumbai to take part in Femina Miss India. She along with Smriti Irani are those contestants who reached great stardom on TV. Dipannita Sharma was also a contestants and made it to top 5. She did a lot of ramp shows and has done television commercials for many well known companies such as Sprite, Bru, Dabur, Pond's, Santoor, Colgate, Philips, Breeze, etc.

Pradhan made her acting debut with the historical tele-series Noorjahan which was telecasted in Doordarshan in 1999. She never thought of becoming an actor, but when Cinevistaas offered her the lead role in Noor Jahan, she decided to give it a shot.

She also appeared in three music videos (which were Talat Aziz's Khubsoorat, Hans Raj Hans's Jhanjar, and Sonu Nigam's Yaad) during the year 2000 to 2001.

In October 2001, Pradhan rose to fame with tele-series Kutumb on Sony TV where she played the lead role of Gauri Agarwal Mittal. The show ended in 2002, but the channel & production house brought the second season of the show, Kutumb, with the same leads. Soon after in 2003, she did an episodic role as Shweta in Krishna Arjun on Star Plus, and she then appeared in another family drama named Naam Gum Jayegaa on Sony TV as the female lead Priyanka Singh. In 2003, she also appeared as Mayuri / Gauri in one of the episodes of the horror tele-series Kya Hadsaa Kya Haqeeqat.
In 2002, she participated in one of the episodes of the singing reality show Kisme Kitna Hai Dum on Star Plus along with other television actors.

After a string of cameos and a short series, Pradhan was approached in 2004 to play the supporting lead as Nandini Thakkar in Kyunki Saas Bhi Kabhi Bahu Thi on Star Plus. The role brought her numerous awards. In the same year, she appeared in Isse Kehte Hai Golmaal Ghar that aired on Sahara One channel as the main lead opposite Manav Gohil. The series premiered on 30 October 2004, and aired every Saturday at 8:30 p.m. IST.

In March 2005, she entered the show Special Squad on Star One as the Forensic Expert and Special Squad head Dr. Deepika Ghosh. Pradhan has also made special appearances in other Indian series like Rihaee and Jassi Jaissi Koi Nahin on Sony TV.

In 2006, she participated in reality shows such as Nach Baliye 2 (a celebrity couple dance reality show) and Jodee Kamaal Ki (a celebrity couple game show) on Star One along with her husband Hiten Tejwani, and played the part of Kanan in the romantic drama-series Kaisa Ye Pyar Hai.

In May 2008, she entered the youth oriented show Left Right Left (that aired on SAB TV) as Captain Shona Das, an army consultant. In that vary year, she along with her husband Hiten Tejwani appeared as contestant in two reality shows; Kabhi Kabhii Pyaar Kabhi Kabhii Yaar and Kya Aap Paanchvi Pass Se Tez Hain?. In 2008, Pradhan and her husband also hosted some of the episodes of the celebrity couple dance reality show Nach Baliye 4 on Star Plus.

In 2009, Pradhan did a long cameo in Star Plus's afternoon long-running hit show Kumkum  –  Ek Pyara Sa Bandhan as Aditi Kapoor along with her husband.

After having twins, Pradhan took a five-year break from television and decided not to work till her children turned four. During her break, she pursued her passion for porcelain painting. She learned about this form of painting under Sangita Shetty Chowhan. Gauri is also one of the partners of the company called Colours On Fire, owned by Chowhan.

In 2010, Pradhan along with her husband opened a restro-bar named Barcode 053 (a franchise of Crepe Station Café) at Andheri in Mumbai.

In the same year she also appeared in one of the episodes of the female celebrity game show Meethi Choori No 1 which aired on NDTV Imagine.

In 2014, after a long hiatus of five years, she made her comeback on television with Ekta Kapoor's show, Meri Aashiqui Tumse Hi (which aired on Colors TV) as Falguni Harshad Parekh.

From 2017 to 2018, she played the role of Anita Sharma on Colors TV's show Tu Aashiqui.

Filmography

Music videos

Television

Reality Shows

Awards and nominations

References

External links 

 

Pradhan,Gauri
Indian television actresses
Marathi people
Female models from Jammu and Kashmir
Indian women television presenters
Indian television presenters
Living people
Actresses in Hindi television
Actresses from Jammu and Kashmir
People from Jammu (city)
1977 births
Actors from Mumbai